The 1998 Australian Drivers' Championship was a CAMS sanctioned Australian motor racing title for drivers of cars conforming to Formula Holden regulations. The title was contested over a six-round, twelve race series with the winner awarded the CAMS Gold Star. Officially the "Holden Australian Drivers' Championship for the CAMS Gold Star", it was the 42nd Australian Drivers' Championship.

New Zealand racer Scott Dixon won the championship driving a (Reynard 92D) for SH Racing, to give the team their first ADC title after coming close to victory in 1997 with Jason Bargwanna. Dixon won five of the twelve races to finish ahead of Victorian racers Mark Noske (Reynard 95D) and Todd Kelly (Reynard 92D). Noske and Kelly each took three race wins, with Simon Wills (Reynard 92D) winning one, the first of his record 23 Australian Drivers' Championship career race victories.

Calendar
The championship was contested over six rounds with two races per round.

Points system
Championship points were awarded on a 20–15–12–10–8–6–4–3–2–1 basis to the first ten finishers in each race.

Championship standings

	
 Formula Holden regulations mandated the use of an approved Holden V6 engine.
 Race 2 of Round 5 at Calder was stopped due to adverse weather and half points were awarded to placegetters.

Notes & references

External links
 Gold Star Winners – 1957 – 2009, formula3.com.au

Australian Drivers' Championship
Drivers' Championship
Formula Holden
Australian Drivers